Talgat Amangeldyuly Musabayev (Talğat Amankeldıūly Mūsabaev; born 7 January 1951) is a Kazakh test pilot and former cosmonaut who flew on three spaceflights. His first two spaceflights were long-duration stays aboard the Russian space station Mir. His third spaceflight was a short duration visiting mission to the International Space Station, which also carried the first paying space tourist Dennis Tito. He retired as a cosmonaut in November 2003. Since 2007 he has been head of Kazakhstan's National Space Agency, KazCosmos.

Early career
Musabayev graduated from Riga Civil Aviation Engineers Institute in 1974. Then in 1983 he graduated from Higher Military Aviation School in Akhtubinsk, with an engineering diploma. Musabayev received several awards as an aerobatic flyer and was selected as a cosmonaut on 11 May 1990. In 1991, he was appointed to Major and transferred to the cosmonaut group of Air Force (TsPK-11).

Cosmonaut career
Musabayev was selected to be a cosmonaut on 11 May 1990.

Mir EO-16
His first spaceflight was as a crew member of the long-duration mission Mir EO-16, which was launched and landed by the spacecraft Soyuz TM-19. Musabayev was designated Flight Engineer; the mission lasted from 1 July 1994 to 4 November 1994, for a total duration of 125 days 22 hours 53 minutes.

Mir EO-25
His second spaceflight was as Commander of another long-duration expedition called Mir EO-25, which was launched by the spacecraft Soyuz TM-27. The mission lasted from 29 January 1998 to 25 August 25, 1998.

ISS EP-1
His third mission was as Commander of ISS EP-1, which was a visiting mission to the International Space Station. It was launched by Soyuz TM-32, and was landed by Soyuz TM-31 on 6 May 2001, for a total duration of 7 days 22 hours 4 minutes. This visiting mission was notable for carrying the first ever paying space tourist Dennis Tito.

, he was among the top 30 cosmonauts by time in space.

Later life
He retired from being a cosmonaut in November 2003. He became deputy head of the Zhukovsky Air Force Engineering Academy and was appointed to Major General in September 2003. From 2005 to 2007 he was General Director of "Bayterek" Corp. which was a Kazakhstani-Russian Joint Venture.

11 April 2007, Musabayev was appointed Head of the National Space Agency of the Republic of Kazakhstan, also known as KazCosmos.

From July 13, 2017 to January 24, 2023 - Deputy of the Senate of the Parliament of the Republic of Kazakhstan.

Personal life
He is married and has two children.

Honours and awards

 Hero of the Russian Federation (24 November 1994) – for active participation in the preparation and successful implementation of lengthy space flight on the orbital scientific research complex Mir, displaying courage and heroism
 People's Hero of Kazakhstan (1995)
 Order of Merit for the Fatherland;
2nd class (28 September 2001) – for their courage and heroism in the implementation of the international space flight
3rd class (25 December 1998) – for their courage and selflessness shown during spaceflight on the orbital scientific research complex Mir
 Order Otan (1998)
 Order Barys (Leopard), 1st class (2002)
 Medal "For Merit in Space Exploration" (12 April 2011) – for outstanding contribution to the development of international cooperation in manned space flight
 Medal "Astana" (1999)
 Order of Friendship of Peoples (10 October 1991) – for active participation in preparation for space flight on the orbital scientific research complex Mir, a great contribution to strengthening mutual understanding, friendship and trust between the peoples of the Soviet Union and the Republic of Austria
 Pilot-Cosmonaut of the Russian Federation (1994)
 Pilot-Cosmonaut of Kazakhstan (1995)
 Decoration of Honour for Services to the Republic of Austria (Austria, 1991)
 Officer of the Legion of Honour (France, October 2010) – for services to the exploration of space and, in particular, for close cooperation with France and French astronauts during his second 208-day space flight in 1998, as well as effective strategic partnership with France as the head of KazCosmos
 NASA Space Flight Medal (United States, 1998) for distinguished contributions to the Shuttle-Mir program

References

External links 
Personal website (Russian)
The official website of the city administration Baikonur – Honorary citizens of Baikonur

1951 births
Living people
People from Almaty Region
Riga Aviation University alumni
Kazakhstani cosmonauts
Heroes of the Russian Federation
Recipients of the Order "For Merit to the Fatherland", 2nd class
Heroes of Kazakhstan
Recipients of the Order of Friendship of Peoples
Russian cosmonauts
Recipients of the Medal "For Merit in Space Exploration"
Recipients of the Decoration for Services to the Republic of Austria
Officiers of the Légion d'honneur
Kazakhstani engineers
Spacewalkers
Mir crew members